The 2020–21 REMA 1000-ligaen was the 54th season of REMA 1000-ligaen, Norway's premier handball league.

Team information 
A total of 13 teams will be participating in the 2020/21 edition of REMA 1000-ligaen. 10 teams were qualified directly from the 2019/20 season. The three top ranked teams from the 1. divisjon, Larvik HK, Flint Tønsberg and Rælingen HK were promoted to REMA 1000-ligaen.

Regular season
Several changes due to the ongoing COVID-19-pandemic had effect on this season. The first plan was the season would only be half-played, and no teams would directly be relegated to the First Division. Changes also applied to the Championship play-offs and order of the teams in the play-offs to First Division. On 19 April, these plans were cancelled and changed yet again. Now, only one match will be played, and the winner of the match between Vipers Kristiansand and Storhamar HE will determine the winner of the league. The other placings will be adjusted to their average placement. No teams will be relegated to the First Division and from the First Division, meaning 2021–22 REMA 1000-ligaen will consist of 14 teams and the First Division of 11 teams next season. All play-offs are cancelled. The qualification for the Women's EHF Champions League and the Women's EHF European Cup will be given to the teams selected, based on results of the current season, previous season and the current season's Norwegian Cup, but mainly based on the previous season.

Standings

Results
In the table below the home teams are listed on the left and the away teams along the top.

Championship playoffs
Cancelled due to the COVID-19 restrictions in Norway.

Awards

All Star Team and other awards 
The All Star Team and other awards were announced on 25 May 2021.

Season statistics

Top goalscorers

Regular season

Relegation playoff
Cancelled due to the COVID-19 restrictions in Norway.

References

Notes

External links
 Norwegian Handball Federaration 

Eliteserien
Eliteserien
Eliteserien